Otto  Pfister is a nature photographer with particular expertise on 
the wildlife of Ladakh, India.  While working in India for over 12 years with the 
Swiss Agency for Development and Cooperation, he was an avid bird
photographer in his free time, eventually transitioning to a naturalist with
strong interests in biodiversity monitoring and conservation. 

Pfister is the author of Birds and Mammals of Ladakh (2004) and co-author of A Photographic Guide to the Birds of the  Himalayas (1998).  He has also authored, with Bikram Grewal and Bill Harvey, A Photographic Guide to the Birds of India (2002). 
His favourite lens is Nikkor 500 mm/f4.

Born in Switzerland,  Pfister has lived in different parts of the world,
currently making his home in Colombia.

References

Swiss ornithologists
Living people
Year of birth missing (living people)
Nature photographers